The Battle of Leuthen was fought on 5 December 1757 and involved Frederick the Great's Prussian Army using maneuver warfare and terrain to rout a larger Austrian force completely, which was commanded by Prince Charles of Lorraine and Count Leopold Joseph von Daun. The victory ensured Prussian control of Silesia during the Third Silesian War, which was part of the Seven Years' War.

The battle was fought in the town of Leuthen (now Lutynia, Poland), 10 km (6 mi) northwest of Breslau, (now Wrocław, Poland), in Prussian (formerly Austrian) Silesia. By exploiting the training of his troops and his superior knowledge of the terrain, Frederick created a diversion at one end of the battlefield and moved most of his smaller army behind a series of low hillocks. The surprise attack in oblique order on the unsuspecting Austrian flank baffled Prince Charles, who took several hours to realize that the main action was to his left, not his right. Within seven hours, the Prussians had destroyed the Austrians and erased any advantage that the Austrians had gained throughout the campaigning in the preceding summer and autumn. Within 48 hours, Frederick had laid siege to Breslau, which resulted in the city's surrender on 19–20 December.

Leuthen was the last battle at which Prince Charles commanded the Austrian Army before his sister-in-law, Empress Maria Theresa, appointed him as governor of the Habsburg Netherlands and placed Leopold Joseph von Daun in command of the army. The battle also established beyond doubt Frederick's military reputation in European circles and was arguably his greatest tactical victory. After the Battle of Rossbach on 5 November, the French had refused to participate further in Austria's war with Prussia, and after Leuthen (5 December), Austria could not continue the war by itself.

Background

Although the Seven Years' War was a global conflict, it acquired a specific intensity in the European theater as a result of the competition between Frederick II of Prussia, known as Frederick the Great, and Maria Theresa of Austria. Their rivalry dated from 1740, when upon Maria Theresa's ascension, Frederick had attacked and annexed the prosperous province of Silesia. The 1748 Treaty of Aix-la-Chapelle, which concluded War of the Austrian Succession (1740–1748) between Prussia and Maria Theresa's allies, awarded Silesia to Prussia. Maria Theresa had signed the treaty to gain time to rebuild her military forces and forge new alliances and intended to regain her ascendancy in the Holy Roman Empire and to reacquire Silesia. Similarly, France sought to break the British dominance of the Atlantic trade.

In 1754, escalating tensions between Britain and France in North America offered the Empress the opportunity to regain her lost territories and to limit Prussia's ever-growing power. France and Austria put aside their old rivalry to form a coalition of their own; Maria Theresa agreed that one of her daughters, Maria Antonia, would marry the Dauphin of France, and her chief ministers negotiated a military and political pact advantageous to both parties. That drove Britain to align herself with George II's nephew, Frederick II. Their alliance also involved the Electorate of Hanover, which was held in personal union by George, along with George's and Frederick's relatives, who ruled the Principality of Brunswick-Wolfenbüttel and the Landgraviate of Hesse-Kassel. That series of political manoeuvers became known as the Diplomatic Revolution.

When war broke out in 1756, Frederick overran Saxony and campaigned in Bohemia, where he defeated the Austrians on 6 May 1757 at the Battle of Prague. Learning that the French forces had invaded his ally's territory of Hanover, Frederick moved west. On 5 November 1757, an infantry regiment of about 1,000 men and 1,500 of his cavalry defeated the combined French and Austrian force of 30,000 at the Battle of Rossbach in a 90-minute battle. In his absence, however, the Austrians had managed to retake Silesia: the Empress's brother-in-law, Prince Charles, took the city of Schweidnitz and moved on Breslau in lower Silesia.

Heading back to Silesia, Frederick learned of the fall of Breslau in late November. He and his 22,000 men covered  in 12 days and, at Liegnitz, joined up with the Prussian troops who had survived the fighting at Breslau. The augmented army of about 33,000 troops, with approximately 167 cannons, arrived near Leuthen to find 66,000 Austrians in possession.

Terrain and troop strengths

Most of Lower Silesia is a rolling plain of fertile land. It includes black and alluvial soils near Breslau (Wrocław) and in river valleys, mixed with more sandy soils. Between the Oder river and the foot of the Sudeten Mountains, it has mild climate, fertile soils and extensive water network, which made it a coveted agricultural resource.

In the area northwest of Breslau, the absence of steep hills makes the observation of an approaching enemy easy, and the relative flatness limited hiding manoeuvers. The presence of alluvial soil guaranteed relatively-soft ground, less than what Frederick would face at Kunersdorf in 1758 but enough to provide the occasional natural bogs to bar the passage of troops in some locations or to muffle the sound of marching and horses' hooves. A road connected the villages of Borne, Leuthen, and Lissa with Breslau, across the Oder River and its tributaries.

Habsburgs

Aware of Frederick's approach, Charles and his second-in-command, Count Leopold Joseph von Daun, positioned the army facing west on a  front in country of undulating plains. The Prince deployed his troops in two lines, the right wing at his northernmost point, anchored at Nypern. Leuthen served as the Austrian centre. Charles established his command post there by using a church tower as his observation post and stationing seven battalions in the village itself. The majority of Charles' forces stood on his right wing. A small advanced post stood at Borne, but with Frederick's arrival in force, it withdrew immediately to the east. The Austrian position intersected at right angles with the principal road between Borne and Breslau and passed through Frobelwitz and Lissa. He secured Nypern with eight grenadier companies and placed his cavalry at Guckerwitz (now Kokorzyce, part of the village Krępice). The Austrian line extended as far south as Sagschütz (now Zakrzyce), where his cavalry stood at right angles to the infantry and created a line between Sagschütz and Gohlau. The positions were secured with additional grenadiers and pickets. Troops filled villages and woods, and hastily made abatis and redoubts. Pickets guarded all communication points as well as road and path crossings. The left wing was his shortest, with cavalry placed at the far end, near a stream by the village of Gohlau. Charles had an amalgamated force of Habsburg troops, including several contingents from the Military Frontier and imperial troops from the Duchies of Württemberg and Bavaria.

Prussia
Frederick had learned the countryside by heart on previous maneuvers. In front of him, a cluster of low hills dotted the landscape along an axis approximately parallel to the Austrian line. He knew the names of the hills: Schleierberg, Sophienberg, Wachberg and Butterberg. They were hardly hills, more like hillocks, but were high enough to provide a screen for his troops. Facing an army twice his size, he had to rely on his own army's tactical training and to use the terrain to maneuver his men into an optimal position. Frederick had one of the finest armies in Europe: any company of his troops fired at least four volleys a minute, and some of them could fire a phenomenal five, which was twice the rate of fire of most other European armies. Only the Russians could come close to achieving that rate. The Prussians could maneuver better than any of the armies in Europe and could march faster, and they had just come from a resounding success at Rossbach. His artillery could quickly deploy and redeploy to support his infantry. His cavalry, superbly trained, could maneuver and charge with horses flank to flank and riders knee to knee and move at a full gallop.

Battle

Prussian feint
The foggy weather made it difficult to see positions from either side, but Frederick and his commanders used the fog to their advantage. Leaving a cavalry unit and a cluster of infantry in front of the northernmost end of the Austrian line (the Austrian right), Frederick deployed the remainder, the bulk of his forces toward Leuthen itself. Charles saw them start their redeployment and may have interpreted the maneuver as withdrawal at least for a while.

At 4:00 a.m. on Sunday, Frederick moved toward the Austrian right wing in four columns, with infantry in the inner two and cavalry in the outer two. Using the knolls to block the Austrians' view of his movements, Frederick shifted the two columns of infantry and one of cavalry obliquely to his own right. The leftmost column of cavalry remained behind to convince the Austrians that it was still approaching directly at the latter end of the Austrian line, near Frobelwitz. The visible distraction screened Frederick's intent of executing an oblique maneuver like the one that he had used successfully only weeks earlier at the Battle of Rossbach. Prince Charles, watching from his vantage point, moved his entire reserve to his right flank. That not only weakened the left flank but also stretched his front from Leuthen past Frobelwitz and on to Nypern and extended it well beyond its original .

While a single column of cavalry mesmerised Charles at his rightmost flank, the rest of the Prussians continued undetected, behind those hills across the Austrian front and overreached the Austrian left wing.

Oblique maneuver

The Prussian infantry marched southward and remained behind a line of low hills, out of the Austrians' sight. When the heads of both superbly-drilled Prussian columns, the distances between the marching platoons remaining exactly the width of each platoon's front, had passed the Austrian left flank, the columns veered left toward the enemy and continued their march until they had passed beyond the left Austrian flank. On command, the platoons of the columns then faced left at Lobetinz, and the whole Prussian army stood in line of battle, two to three men deep, at a nearly-right angle to the weakest point of the Austrian left. Similarly, Hans Joachim von Zieten's cavalry had traversed the entire Austrian front and positioned itself at a 45-degree angle to the Austrian flank.

The Prussian artillery perched on the reverse slopes of the Butterberg and was hidden from the Austrians' view while it prepared to move to the crest to time their bombardment with the infantry's attack. The bulk of the repositioned Prussian army now faced the smallest component of the Austrian line. The only column of Prussian cavalry and the small reserve of infantry remaining at the Austrian far right continued to demonstrate in front of the Austrians and even moved further north, as if an attack would occur there.

Attack 
The Austrians were astonished at the Prussian appearance on their left flank, but the objective was soon clear. The Prussian infantry, now arrayed in the conventional two lines of battle, advanced on the weakest part of the Austrian line with the intention of rolling up the flank. The Austrian colonels on the scene did their best by turning their own lines 90 degrees and trying to take advantage of a shallow ditch, which faced the Prussian line. Franz Leopold von Nádasdy, who commanded the flank, asked Charles for support, a request that was ignored. Even in the late morning, with most of the Prussian army on his left flank, he still believed that any attack would come at the northern flank. Most of the men in the first Austrian line were Württembergers, Protestant troops whose willingness to fight the Lutheran Prussians had been called into question by the Austrian command. The Württembergers held out and maintained steady musket fire until the mass of Prussians emerged through the haze of gunpowder. They then ran for their lives, sweeping the Bavarians deployed by Nádasdy to support his flank with them.

The first wave of Prussian infantry, supported by Frederick's artillery, which now pounded away from the crest of one of the hillocks, pushed steadily toward Leuthen. Commanded by Moritz of Anhalt-Dessau, the seasoned infantry and grenadiers went into battle with 60 rounds per man, according to Prussian regulation. When they overwhelmed the first Austrian line, they had already run out of ammunition. Nádasdy sent his own small cavalry against the Prussian grenadier column and its infantry support but to no avail. Nádasdy withdrew his men in chaos with his troops disarrayed. As the Austrians withdrew, the Prussian artillery raked them with enfilade fire.
The Prussian infantry and grenadiers reached Leuthen in 40 minutes and pushed the Austrian troops into the village. Prussian grenadiers breached the wall first and stormed the church, where many of the defenders were killed. Hand-to-hand fighting raged throughout the village. Charles-Joseph Lamoral, eventually Prince de Ligne, was then a captain in an Austrian regiment of foot:
Our Lieutenant-Colonel fell[,] killed almost at the first; beyond this we lost our Major, and indeed all the Officers but three.... We had crossed two successive ditches, which lay in an orchard to the left of the first houses in Leuthen; and were beginning to form in front of the village. But there was no standing of it. Besides a general cannonade such as can hardly be imagined, there was a rain of case-shot upon this Battalion, of which I, as there was no Colonel left, had to take command.For a full text of Charles-Joseph Lamoral's account, see Thomas Carlyle, History of Frederick Second, Harper, 1901. pp. 202–03.
Leuthen was not a big village, troops were so closely packed they stood 30 to 100 ranks deep and the killing was terrible. Lamoral commented later that his battalion, usually some 1,000 strong, as well as some Hungarians and some grenadiers who had been separated from their own companies, gave him fewer than 200 men. He drew them back to the height at the edge of the village, where there was a windmill around which they could take shelter. Eventually, the Prussian Life Guards, commanded by Captain Wichard Joachim Heinrich von Möllendorf broke through the village cemetery and forced them to abandon their post.

The Austrians briefly took the advantage when they moved a battery from the ridge north of the village to cover their infantry, and the fire from the battery allowed the infantry to deploy at right angles to their original front. Frederick responded by ordering the last of his reserved left wing to advance, but the Austrian battery drove it back. Finally, Frederick's heavy cannons on the Butterberg, a small knoll to the west of town, laid down a barrage. Some participants said that barrage, more than the Prussian infantry, won the battle.

The assault on the wall briefly exposed General Wolf Frederick von Retzow's infantry line. More than two hours had elapsed since the Prince had ordered his cavalry back to Leuthen, but it arrived opportunely. Commanded by Joseph Count Lucchesi d’ Averna the cavalry hurried to take them in the flank; a successful cavalry charge at that critical moment could have turned the tide of battle. Unfortunately for the Austrians, 40 squadrons of Zieten's cavalry awaited them at Radaxdorf and charged their flank, and another 30 squadrons commanded by Georg Wilhelm von Driesen charged their front. The Bayreuth Dragoons hit the other flank; and the Puttkamer Hussars charged the rear. Lucchessi was killed by being decapitated by a cannonball, and his troopers were scattered. The cavalry mêlée soon swirled into the Austrian infantry line behind Leuthen, which caused more confusion. Overrun by the Prussian horse, the Austrian infantry broke. The infantry and then the cavalry retreated toward Breslau, where they crossed the Schweidnitzer Weistritz river, then called the "Black Water".

Maps
Solid red lines indicate Habsburg positions. Solid blue lines indicate Prussian positions. Dotted lines show movement. Rectangles with a diagonal line indicate cavalry.

Aftermath 

As the smoke cleared, the Prussian infantry reformed its lines and prepared to pursue the fleeing Austrians. Snow began to fall, and Frederick halted the pursuit. A few soldiers, perhaps only one of them, started to sing the well-known chorale Nun danket alle Gott (Now Thank We All Our God). Eventually the entire army may have joined in the song, but that story is likely apocryphal.

Frederick pushed toward Lissa. Refugees from the battle had filled the town, and he found the courtyard of the local castle crowded with startled Austrian officers. Reportedly, after the King dismounted, he addressed them politely, "Good evening, Gentlemen, I dare say you did not expect me here. Can one get a night's lodging along with you?"

After a day of rest, on 7 December, Frederick sent half his cavalry with Zieten, chasing Charles's retreating army, now heading toward Königgrätz by Schweidnitz and captured another 2,000 men and their baggage. With the rest of his army, Frederick marched on Breslau. By chasing Charles's army into Bohemia, the Prussians guaranteed the isolation of the Allied garrison holding Breslau. The Austrian general left in command of the city, Lieutenant Field Marshal Salman Sprecher von Bernegg, had a combined force of French and Austrian of 17,000 men. Breslau was a well-fortified city of walls and moats. The Austrians were determined to hold Breslau not only because losing it would cost them control of Silesia and considerable diminution of prestige but also because of the immense quantities of stores that the city held. The Austrian commander, recognizing his grim plight, posted placards on gallows and poles throughout the city and warned that anyone who spoke of surrender would be hanged immediately. On 7 December, Frederick laid siege to the city, and the future of Austrian control of Breslau and the region looked grim. Indeed, Breslau surrendered on 19–20 December.

Casualties
Out of an army of approximately 66,000 men, the Austrians lost 22,000, including 3,000 dead, 7,000 wounded and an astonishing 12,000 captured. Of the dead and wounded, the Austrian demographer and historian Gaston Bodart estimated that almost 5% were officers. He also placed such other losses as capture and desertion at 17,000, almost 26%. Charles lost entire regiments, which scattered in the first attacks or overrun at the end; they simply dissolved in the waves of Prussian blue coats. The Prussians also captured 51 standards and 116 of the 250 Austrian cannons. Of the Prussian army of 36,000, Frederick lost 6,344, including 1,141 dead, 5,118 wounded and 85 captured. He lost none of his artillery.

Despite the victory, its cost was high: Frederick lost one fifth of the men he had taken into battle, including two of his major generals.

The battle presented a severe blow to Austrian morale. The army had been soundly beaten by another half its size with fewer guns and tired after a long march over twelve-days. Charles and his second in-command, Count Leopold Joseph von Daun, sank "in the depths of despondency", and the Prince could not fathom what had happened. Charles had a mixed-to-poor record against Frederick in past encounters, but he had never fared so badly as at Leuthen. After the crushing defeat, Maria Theresa replaced him with Daun. Charles retired from military service and later served as the governor of the Habsburg Netherlands.

The Austrians also learned some lessons, such as not to fight the Prussians in open fields and to choose their own ground for battle. They later used those lessons.

Assessments

Frederick had benefited from an obliging enemy. Firstly, Charles saw what he wanted to see regarding the principal attack, instead of using his efficient light cavalry to scout the Prussian movements. Frederick commented later that a lone patrol could have uncovered his plan. The cavalry that Frederick had left demonstrating in front of the northernmost position of the Austrian line was simply a diversion to hide his real movements. Secondly, the Austrians obliged him by their failure to post pickets on their unprotected flank south of Leuthen. Nádasdy's omission of outposts on his open flank south of Leuthen was a surprising oversight for an officer with his long years of experience against the Prussians. He should have considered the possibility of an attack from an unexpected place because that was Frederick's modus operandi. Thirdly, even when confronted with the attack on his left, the diversion on the right flank near Frobelwitz continued to mesmerize Charles. When he ordered cavalry to move from the north to support the faltering troops in and around Leuthen in the south, they had too far to travel in too little time.

The battle was Frederick's greatest victory so far, perhaps the greatest use of tactics in his career, and showed the superiority of Prussian infantry. In one day, Frederick had regained every advantage the Austrians had won earlier that year at Breslau and Schweidnitz and ended the Austrian attempt to reclaim Silesia. The battle became an exemplar on the use of 18th-century linear tactics. Frederick had learned valuable lessons at  Battles of Prague and Kolin in which his infantry had run out of ammunition and lost the initiative. At Leuthen, ammunition wagons moved with the advancing lines of grenadiers and infantry battalions, which allowed the troops to be resupplied quickly without losing momentum. Although some infantrymen fired as many as 180 rounds, the advance never halted for lack of ammunition. The Prussian cavalry successfully protected the infantry's flanks, most notably during Nádasdy's assault on the Prussian grenadiers at Leuthen's church. The cavalry also provided tactically important charges, disrupting Austrian attempts to reform, which eventually turned the defeat into a rout. Frederick's horse artillery, which was sometimes called the flying artillery for its ability to move rapidly, maintained its fire and kept pace with the army and deployed and redeployed its guns as needed. In addition to the physical damage they wrought, the distinctive sound of the horse artillery's 12-pounder cannon, sometimes called Brummers, heightened Prussian morale and reduced that of the Austrians.

The victory changed the attitude of Frederick's enemies. Before the battle, he was often referred to in an unflattering, even demeaning, manner, but after Leuthen, he was widely called the King of Prussia in both polite and popular conversation. The victories at Leuthen and Rossbach earned Frederick respect and fear, which even his bitter enemies held for the rest of the war and the subsequent peace. Both battles probably saved Prussia from conquest by Austria. Half-a-century later, Napoleon called Leuthen "a masterpiece of movements, maneuvers and resolution".

Memorials

A memorial erected in 1854 honoured the Prussian army at Leuthen. The Berlin architect Friedrich August Stüler provided the design for the monument, and Christian Daniel Rauch created the goddess of victory. The sculptor Heinrich Menzel from Neisse constructed the column in his workshop, in local white-gray stone. Moritz Geiss executed the plinth and the goddess in zinc casting and gilded the statue Victoria for a better effect. Befitting its importance in the establishment of the Prussian state and the mythos of Frederick the Great, the monument reached . During or after the Second World War, soldiers or partisans dynamited the monument, and only ruins of its pedestal remain, renovated in 2011.

Sources

Notes

Footnotes

Bibliography 

 Asprey, Robert. Frederick the Great: A Magnificent Enigma, Ticknor & Fields, 1986, 
 Anderson, Fred. Crucible of War: The Seven Years' War and the Fate of Empire in British North America, 1754–1766. Knopf Doubleday Publishing Group, 2007, 
 Black, Jeremy. "Essay and Reflection: On the 'Old System' and the Diplomatic Revolution' of the Eighteenth Century", International History Review (1990) 12:2 pp. 301–23.
 Bodart, Gaston. Losses of Life in Modern Wars, Clarendon Press, 1916, 
 Blanning, Tim. Frederick the Great, Random House, 2016, 
 Carlyle, Thomas. History of Frederick Second, Harper, 1901. 
 
 Citino, Robert M., The German Way of War: From the Thirty Years War to the Third Reich. University Press of Kansas. Lawrence, KS, 2005, 
 
 David, Saul. War: The Definitive Visual History, Penguin, 2009. 
 Duffy, Christopher, Prussia's Glory: Rossbach and Leuthen 1757, Emperor's Press, 2003. 
 Duffy, Christopher, The Army of Frederick the Great, Emperor Press, 1996, 
 Duffy, Christopher, The Army of Maria Theresa, Terence Wise, 1990, 
 Fuller, J.F.C., A Military History of the Western World, Da Capo Press, 1987, 
  Hofer, Achim. "Joseph Goldes (1802–1886) Fest-Reveille (1858) über den Choral 'Nun danket alle Gott' für Militärmusik" in Peter Moormann, Albrecht Riethmüller, Rebecca Wolf eds., Paradestück Militärmusik: Beiträge zum Wandel staatlicher Repräsentation durch Musik, Transcript Verlag (2012), pp. 217–38. 
 Horn, D.B. "The Diplomatic Revolution" in J.O. Lindsay, ed., The New Cambridge Modern History vol. 7, The Old Regime: 1713–63 (1957), pp. 449–64. 
 Keeney, L. Douglas. The Pointblank Directive: Three Generals and the Untold Story of the Daring Plan that Saved D-Day, Bloomsbury Publishing, 2012, 
  König, Anton Balthasar. Lorenz Ernst von Münchow, Biographisches Lexikon aller Helden und Militairpersonen, welche sich in Preußischen Diensten berühmt gemacht haben. Band 3. Arnold Wever, Berlin 1790, S. 75.
  Kroener, Bernhard R."'Nun danket alle Gott.' der Choral von Leuthen und Friedrich der Große als protestantischer Held; die Produktion politischer Mythen im 19. und 20. Jahrhundert" in Hartmut Lehmann & Gerd Krumeich eds. "Gott mit uns": Religion, Nation und Gewalt im 19. und frühen 20. Jahrhundert, Vandenhoeck & Ruprecht (2000), pp. 105–34, .
 Kosmala, Gerard. Geographical Characteristics of Silesia, Academy of Physical Education in Katowice, 2015
 Latimer, Jon, Deception in War, London: John Murray, 2001. 
  Leipziger Illustrirte Zeitung. No. 593. 11 November 1854.
 Moorhouse, Roger. The Historian at Large: The Forgotten Battlefield at Leuthen. 5 December 2014 version. Accessed 7 February 2017.
  Neue genealogisch-historische Nachrichten von den vornehmsten Begebenheiten, welche sich an den europäischen Höfen zugetragen, vol 54, Heinsius, 1759, pp. 608–09
 The New York Times. Silesia; Geography. 23 December 1981.
 O'Brien, Cormac, Outnumbered: Incredible Stories of History's Most Surprising Battlefield Upsets, Fair Winds Press, 2010, 
 Overy, Richard. A History of War in 100 Battles, Oxford University Press, 2014, 
 Redman, Herbert J. Frederick the Great and the Seven Years' War, 1756–1763, McFarland, 2014, 
 Showalter, Dennis E. The Early Modern World: Soldiers' Lives, Greenwood, 2007, 
  Sprecher, Daniel. "Sprecher", Neue Deutsche Biographie 24 (2010), S. 745–46.
  Sprecher, Salomon, von Bernegg. Diarium der Belagerung von Breslau; und Capitulations-Puncte von der Übergabe an Se. Königl. Majestät in Prüssen: Nebst einem Verzeichniß mit Nahmen, derer Generals, Staabs-Officiers und andern Officiers, dann vom Feldwebel an summariter derer Kayserl. Königl. Truppen, so den 21ten December 1757. Berlin, 1758, 
 Tucker, Spencer. Battles that Changed History: An Encyclopedia of World Conflict. ABC-CLIO, 2010, 
 Wilson, Peter H. The Heart of Europe: A History of the Holy Roman Empire. Penguin Publishing, 2016, 

Battle of Leuthen
Battles of the Seven Years' War
Battles involving Prussia
Battles involving Austria
1757 in Austria
Battles of the Silesian Wars
Battles of Frederick the Great
History of Lower Silesian Voivodeship